Soleyman Kandi may refer to:
 Soleyman Kandi, East Azerbaijan
 Soleyman Kandi, Kurdistan
 Soleyman Kandi, West Azerbaijan